John Kenneth Hulm (4 July 1923, Southport, UK – 16 January 2004) was a British-American physicist and engineer, known for the development of superconducting materials with applications to high-field superconducting magnets. In 1953 with George F. Hardy he discovered the first A-15 superconducting alloy.

John K. Hulm received his undergraduate degree in 1943 from the University of Cambridge and then worked on radar development until the end of WWII. After the war he returned to Cambridge and received his PhD in 1949 with a thesis on the thermal conductivity of superconductors. His thesis advisor was David Shoenberg. At the University of Chicago, Hulm was a postdoc from 1949 to 1951 and an assistant professor from 1951 to 1954.

In 1954 he became employed at the Westinghouse Electric Corporation research laboratory in Pittsburgh. There he assembled and led a research team dealing with the physics of materials, especially superconductors. He was promoted in 1956 to manager of
the lab’s Solid State Physics Department and in 1960 to associate director, Material Science, with several departments under his management. He spent the rest of his working career at Westinghouse.

In the 1960s Hulm took on more managerial and engineering duties. For the two years 1974 and 1975 on a leave of absence from Westinghouse, he was the science attaché at the U.S. Embassy in London. He returned to Westinghouse as manager of the Chemical Sciences Department. In the 1980s he was director of corporate research and R&D planning. He retired in 1988. In 1989 he accompanied Mildred Dresselhaus to Japan to evaluate that country’s superconductivity research. During his career he was the author or co-author of about 100 scientific papers.

In 1948 Hulm married Joan Askham. Upon his death he was survived by his widow, four daughters, a son, and six grandchildren.

Awards and honours
 1964 — John Price Wetherill Medal (shared with Howard Aiken, John Eugene Gunzler, and Bernd Matthias)
 1979 — American Physical Society International Prize for New Materials (shared with J. Eugene Kunzler and Bernd T. Matthias)
 1980 — Member of the National Academy of Engineering
 1988 — Member of the National Academy of Sciences

Selected publications

References

1923 births
2004 deaths
Alumni of the University of Cambridge
Members of the United States National Academy of Sciences
Members of the United States National Academy of Engineering
British materials scientists
20th-century British physicists
20th-century American physicists
British emigrants to the United States